Jed Montero (born Rebecca Gail Bacbac Montero on September 6, 1988) is a Filipina actress, model, athlete and host.

Just like Paulo Lingbanan Avelino, Montero hails from the famous Sagada, Mt. Province. Her parents are Rebecca Bacbac Montero and Jan Dikyam Montero.

Montero is a member of ABS-CBN's elite circle of homegrown talents namely Star Magic.

Montero was a member of the University of the Philippines women's volleyball team, seeing action in the UAAP (Seasons 70 and 71). She was a member of the RC Cola Raiders in the Philippine Super Liga (PSL) from 2013-2014.

Filmography

Television

References

External links
Star Magic Talent Profile: Jed Montero
Official Website
 

1988 births
Star Magic
Filipino film actresses
Filipino television actresses
Living people
Sportspeople from Quezon City
Actresses from Metro Manila
Volleyball players from Metro Manila
Filipino women's volleyball players
University of the Philippines Diliman alumni
Filipino female models
University Athletic Association of the Philippines volleyball players
Filipina gravure idols